Ivanovice na Hané is a town in Vyškov District in the South Moravian Region of the Czech Republic. It has about 2,900 inhabitants.

Administrative parts
The village of Chvalkovice na Hané is an administrative part of Ivanovice na Hané.

Geography
It lies mostly in the Vyškov Gate. The Haná River flows through the town.

History
Ivanovice was founded around 950. It first appeared in the written record in 1183 as a possession of the Knights Hospitaller. They gave it various privileges in 1302 and during their rule, Ivanovice prospered. In 1425, the town was confiscated from them. It changed owners frequently in the following centuries.

During the Thirty Years' War, Ivanovice was severely damaged and lost its significance. The economic development started again in the 19th century. In 1909, Ivanovice was promoted to a town by Franz Joseph I of Austria and changed its name to Ivanovice na Hané.

In 1857, about 23 percent of the town's population was Jewish. The Jewish population declined to 64 individuals by 1930, and the remaining Jews were likely deported to Thereseinstadt during the Holocaust. Many eventually perished in death camps to the east.

Demographics

Transport
The D1 motorway from Brno to Ostrava runs next the town.

Sights

The landmark of the town is the Church of Saint Andrew. The Renaissance-Baroque church from the 16th and 18th centuries was built on Gothic base. The bell tower with Baroque sculptures was added in 1759.

The Ivanovice na Hané Castle was built in the Renaissance style in 1608–1611 by reconstruction of a water fortress from the 14th century. It has valuable arcade galleries. Nowadays the castle is privately owned and inaccessible.

The Jewish presence is commemorated by the former synagogue and Jewish cemetery. The synagogue is one of the most valuable buildings in the town. Nowadays it is used by the Apostolic Church. The Jewish cemetery is located on the eastern outskirts of the town. The oldest preserved tombstones are from the early 17th century.

Notable people
Gustav Karpeles (1848–1909), writer
Bedřich Antonín Wiedermann (1883–1951), organist and composer
Ladislav Kopřiva (1897–1971), politician

References

External links

Populated places in Vyškov District
Cities and towns in the Czech Republic
Shtetls